The 1939 Dayton Flyers football team was an American football team that represented the University of Dayton as an independent during the 1939 college football season. In their 17th season under head coach Harry Baujan, the Flyers compiled a 4–4–1 record.

Schedule

References

Dayton
Dayton Flyers football seasons
Dayton Flyers football